Fragmenta Valesiana is the name given to fragments of Roman text written by Cassius Dio, dispersed throughout various writers, scholastics, grammarians, lexicographers, etc., and  collected by Henri de Valois.

References

Classical Latin literature
Fragment collections